Yelizaveta "Liza" Fyodorovna Mironova (1924 – 29 September 1943) was a Soviet sniper during the Second World War. She has been alternately credited with either 34, or "more than a hundred" kills.

References 

Women in the Russian and Soviet military
1924 births
1943 deaths
Soviet military personnel killed in World War II